Tamara Kathleen Wall (born 23 July 1977) is an English actress, known for playing Grace Black in the Channel 4 soap opera Hollyoaks. Before playing Grace, Wall portrayed the role of Martina Quinn in the BBC soap opera EastEnders. Wall performed the role of Brooke Wyndham in the West End production of Legally Blonde. Wall also appeared as Karen in musical Viva Forever!. She made a guest appearance in One Night in 2012. In 2017, Wall appeared in the third celebrity special of The Crystal Maze.

Filmography

Awards and nominations

References

External links
 
 Biography on the Legally Blonde The Musical website
 Profile on the official Channel 4 website

1977 births
Living people
English television actresses
English stage actresses
English soap opera actresses